Borsonella is a genus of sea snails, marine gastropod mollusks in the family Borsoniidae.

Description
(Original description)  The shell has a small, blunt nucleus of one or two whorls. The sculpture is chiefly spiral, feeble, except for one or two spiral carinae, sometimes with a few small riblets or beads on the principal carina. The periostracum is conspicuous, smooth or vermiculate. The siphonal canal is wide and very short. The outer lip is sharp, simple, arcuate. The columella is solid, with one strong, nearly horizontal plait continuous upon the whole axis. This axis is impervious, the operculum absent. Type Borsonia dalli

There is never more than one plait in Borsonella ; in Cordieria Rouault, 1848, as restricted by Cossmann, there are never less than two. In Rouaultia the anal sulcus is narrow, sharp, and situated at the shoulder in the peripheral carina. Both Cordieria and typical Borsonia have a long and slender canal and the general aspect of Gemmula Weinkauff, 1875, while Borsonella resembles an Antiplanes Dall, 1902 with a strong plait on the proximal part of the columella.

Species
Species within the genus Borsonella include:
 Borsonella abrupta McLean & Poorman, 1971
 Borsonella agassizii (Dall, 1908)
 Borsonella barbarensis Dall, 1919
 Borsonella bartschi (Arnold, 1903)
 Borsonella callicesta (Dall, 1902)
 Borsonella coronadoi (Dall, 1908)
 Borsonella diegensis (Dall, 1908)
 Borsonella erosina (Dall, 1908)
 Borsonella galapagana McLean & Poorman, 1971
 Borsonella hooveri (Arnold, 1903)
 Borsonella merriami (Arnold, 1903)
 Borsonella omphale Dall, 1919
 Borsonella pinosensis Bartsch, 1944
 † Borsonella sinelirata Marwick, 1931 
Species brought into synonymy
 Borsonella angelena Hanna, 1924: synonym of Borsonella omphale Dall, 1919
 Borsonella civitella Dall, 1919: synonym of Borsonella bartschi (Arnold, 1903)
 Borsonella nicoli Dall, 1919: synonym of Borsonella bartschi (Arnold, 1903)
 Borsonella nychia Dall, 1919: synonym of Borsonella coronadoi (Dall, 1908)
 Borsonella rhodope Dall, 1919: synonym of Rhodopetoma diaulax (Dall, 1908)

References

External links
  Bouchet P., Kantor Yu.I., Sysoev A. & Puillandre N. (2011) A new operational classification of the Conoidea. Journal of Molluscan Studies 77: 273-308.

 
Gastropod genera